Shelburne/Fisher Field Aerodrome  is located  south of Shelburne, Ontario, Canada.

References

Registered aerodromes in Ontario